Mount Moresby is the highest mountain of the Queen Charlotte Mountains located  south of Daajing Giids (formerly Queen Charlotte) on Moresby Island in British Columbia, Canada.

References

One-thousanders of British Columbia
Queen Charlotte Mountains